Jake Mulford (born 4 March 2004) is a speedway rider from England.

Career
In 2019, he signed for the Kent Kings for the 2019 National Development League speedway season.

Unable to ride during 2020 because of COVID-19 cancelled season, he continued to ride for Kent in 2021 but appeared in both the NDL and the higher league of the SGB Championship 2021.

In 2022, he was named the number 8 rider for the King's Lynn Stars in the SGB Premiership 2022 (the highest league in Britain). Mulford later switched to Peterborough Panthers to fulfill the same position for them. He also rode regularly for the Belle Vue Colts during the 2022 National Development League speedway season after leaving Kent.

In 2023, he moved up to the Belle Vue first team, being named as the rising star for the Aces for the SGB Premiership 2023.In addition, he signed for Redcar Bears for the SGB Championship 2023.

References 

2004 births
Living people
British speedway riders
Belle Vue Aces riders
Belle Vue Colts riders
Kent Kings riders
King's Lynn Stars riders
Peterborough Panthers riders
Redcar Bears riders